This is a list of women writers who were born in Spain or whose writings are closely associated with that country.

A
Mercedes Abad (born 1961), journalist, short story writer
Rosario de Acuña (1850–1923), playwright, essayist, short story writer and poet
Anna Aguilar-Amat (born 1962), Catalan-language poet, translator
Francisca Aguirre (1930–2019), poet
Aisha (died 1010), acclaimed Arabic-language poet
Caterina Albert (1869–1966), short story writer, novelist and poet
Núria Albó (born 1930), novelist, politician
Aurora de Albornoz (1926–1990), poet
Josefina Aldecoa (1926–2011), novelist
Aurora de Albornoz (born 1947), Galician-language poet, translator, biologist
Concepción Aleixandre (1862–1952), gynaecologist, feminist, non-fiction writer
Marilar Aleixandre (born 1947), writer, translator and biologist
Jesusa Alfau Galván de Solalinde (1895–1943), novelist
Florina Alías (1921–1999), Asturian-language author
Maria Dolors Alibés (1941–2009), children's author
Concha Alós (1926–2011), novelist
Amparo Alvajar (1916–1998), Galician translator, journalist, and playwright
Begoña Ameztoy (born 1951), writer and painter
Blanca Andreu (born 1959), poet
Lola Anglada (c.1893–1984), writer and illustrator
Maria Àngels Anglada (1930–1999), Catalan-language poet, novelist
Núria Añó (born 1973), Catalan-language novelist, short story writer, biographer, essayist
Enriqueta Antolín (1941–2013), journalist and novelist
Clementina Arderiu (1889–1976), Catalan-language poet
Concepción Arenal (1820–1893), feminist writer, poet, essayist
Xela Arias (1962–2003), Galician-language poet, translator
Elena Arnedo (1941–2015), gynaecologist, writer and activist
Rosa Maria Arquimbau (1910–1991), Catalan-language novelist, journalist, feminist
Julia de Asensi (1859–1921), journalist, novelist, children's writer
Matilde Asensi (born 1962), historical novelist, journalist
Judith Astelarra (born 1943), Argentine-born sociologist specializing in gender studies

B
Inés Ballester (born 1958), journalist, cookbook writer and television presenter
Maria Barbal (born 1949), novelist, children's writer
Elia Barceló (born 1957), academic and writing based in Austria
Carmen Baroja (1883–1950), writer and ethnologist
Nuria Barrios (born 1962), poet, fiction and non-fiction writer
Lola Beccaria (born 1963), novelist
Esther Bendahan (born 1964), Moroccan-born Spanish-language novelist, essayist, living in Spain
Pilar Benejam Arguimbau (born 1937), geographer, writer and academic
Maria Beneyto (1925–2011), poet
Elisa Beni (born 1965), journalist, novelist
Sara Berenguer Laosa (1919–2010), poet and activist
Consuelo Berges (1889–1988), translator, journalist, and biographer
Mònica Bernabé (born 1972), journalist and writer
Beatriz Bernal (between 1501 and 1504–ca. 1563) writer, and one of the first women in Spain that could be considered professional writers
Aurora Bertrana (1892–1974), Catalan-language short story writer, novelist
Patrocinio de Biedma y la Moneda (1858–1927), poet and novelist
Carmen Blanco (born 1954), feminist writer, activist and academic
Montserrat Boix (born 1960), journalist
Pilar Bonet (born 1952), journalist and non-fiction writer
Rosario Ustáriz Borra (1927–2009), Aragonese language writer and poet
Maria Lluïsa Borràs i Gonzàlez (1931–2010), writer and exhibition curator
Nuria C. Botey (born 1977), science fiction, fantasy, and horror writer
Dolors Bramon (born 1943), philologist, historian, academic and writer
Mariam Budia (born 1970), author and playwright
Carmen de Burgos (1867–1932), novelist, short story writer, essayist, journalist, translator
Juby Bustamante (1938–2014), journalist
Gabriela Bustelo (born 1962), novelist, journalist, translator

C
Fernán Caballero (1796–1877), novelist
Amparo Cabanes Pecourt (born 1938), academic and politician
Maria Teresa Cabré (born 1947), linguist
María Cambrils (1878–1939), socialist feminist writer
Roser Caminals-Heath (fl. 1990s), Catalan novelist and translator
María Teresa Campos (born 1941), journalist, memoirist, humorous writer
Zenobia Camprubí (1887–1956), Spanish-born writer, diarist, later moved to Cuba and the United States
Matilde Camus (1919–2012), poet, non-fiction writer
Eva Canel (1857–1932), Spanish-born writer who settled in Cuba
Maria Aurèlia Capmany (1918–1991), Catalan novelist, playwright and essayist
Àngels Cardona Palmer (born 1951), Catalan writer, educator and activist
María del Carme Ribé i Ferré (1920–1991), librarian, writer and activist
Ana Caro (1590–1646), Golden Age poet and playwright
Maite Carranza (born 1958), educator and children's writer, mainly in Catalan
Maria Carratalà i Van den Wouver (1899–1984), music critic, translator, playwright 
Luisa Carvajal y Mendoza (1566–1614), religious poet, writer
Sofía Casanova (1861–1958), poet, novelist and journalist
Borita Casas (1911–1999), journalist, playwright and children's writer
Yolanda Castaño (born 1977), painter, literary critic and poet
Josefina Castellví (born 1935), oceanographer, non-fiction writer
María Andrea Casamayor (1700–1780), early female science writer, two works on mathematics
Borita Casas (1911–1999), children's writer
Fina Casalderrey (born 1951), Galician children's writer
Cecilia Castaño (born 1953), professor of political science and applied economics
Yolanda Castaño (born 1977), Galician-language poet, translator
Sofía Castañón (born 1983), poet, journalist, politician
Luisa Castro (born 1966), novelist, poet, journalist, writing in Galician and Spanish
Rosalía de Castro (1837–1885), romanticist poet, writings in Galician and Spanish
Mariana de Carvajal y Saavedra (1620–1670), Golden Age writer
Mercedes Cebrián (poet, short story writer and translator
Natividad Cepeda, poet, writer, and columnist
Annabel Cervantes (born 1969), Catalan-language writer
Mercedes Comaposada (1901–1994), educator, lawyer and writer
Ernestina de Champourcín (1905–1999), poet
Rosa Chacel (1898–1994), well-known novelist
Dulce Chacón (1954–2003), poet, novelist, playwright
Ernestina de Champourcín (1905–1999), poet 
Isabel Cheix (1839–1899), writer of historical, religious and romantic novels as well as poetry and stage plays
Rosa María Cid López (born 1956), academic specializing in gender and women's studies
Victoria Cirlot (born 1955), non-fiction literary writer
Mercè Company (born 1947), writer in Spanish, Catalan and French languages
Flavia Company (born 1963), Argentine-born Spanish novelist, poet, children's writer, writes in Catalan and Spanish
Nieves Concostrina (born 1961), writer and journalist
Carmen Conde Abellán (1907–1996), poet, narrative writer
Paula Contreras Márquez (1911–2008), novelist, short story writer
Carolina Coronado (1820–1911), popular poet, novelist, playwright
Aixa de la Cruz (born 1988), Basque writer of novels and short stories

D
Filomena Dato (1856–1926), feminist, writer
Mercedes Deambrosis (born 1955), Spaniard who writes in French
Nieves Delgado (born 1968), science fiction writer and teacher
Paloma del Río (born 1960), journalist
Paloma Díaz-Mas (born 1954), novelist, playwright, non-fiction writer
Eva Díaz Pérez (born 1971), journalist, essayist and academic
Maria Doménech (1877–1952), Catalan-language writer
María Domínguez (1882–1936), journalist, poet and politician
María Magdalena Domínguez (1922–2021), poet 
Amalia Domingo Soler (1835–1909), novelist, poet, essayist, short story writer, autobiographer
Maite Dono (born 1969), singer-songwriter, poet, and actress
María Dueñas (born 1964), best-selling novelist, academic writer

E
María de Echarri (1878–1955), Catholic apologist and feminist advocate
María Egual (1655–1735), poet and playwright
María Luisa Elío (1926–2009), writer and actress exiled in Mexico
Rosa de Eguílaz y Renart (born 1864, date of death unknown), playwright and journalist
Feliciana Enríquez de Guzmán (1569–c. 1644), playwright
Tina Escaja (born 1965), Spanish-American poet, writer and academic
Teresa Espasa (fl. 1990s), Valencian poet, essayist and academic
Patricia Esteban Erlés, short story writer, Zaragoza
Lucía Etxebarría (born 1966), novelist, poet, essayist
Luisa Etxenike (born 1957), novelist, short story writer and poet

F
Lidia Falcón (born 1935), politician and writer
Elvira Farreras i Valentí (1913–2005), poet and essayist
Cristina Fernández Cubas (born 1945), journalist, short story writer and novelist
Concepció Ferrer (born 1938), philologist, politician and writer
Ángela Figuera Aymerich (1902–1984), Basque poet writing in Spanish
Alaíde Foppa (1914–c. 1980), Spanish born poet, published in Guatemala and Mexico
Francesca Forrellad (1927–2013), Catalan writer
Lluïsa Forrellad (1927–2018), novelist and playwright in Spanish and Catalan
Susana Fortes (born 1959), novelist, columnist
Elena Fortún (1886–1952), children's writer, author of Celia, lo que dice
Isabel Franc (born 1955), novelist, short story writer and essayist
Espido Freire (born 1974), successful novelist, works translated into several languages
Anna Freixas (born 1946), academic and writer on the subjects of aging, feminism, and psychology
Laura Freixas (born 1958), novelist, short story writer, columnist
Milagros Frías (born 1955), writer, journalist and literary reviewer
Gloria Fuertes (1917–1998), poet, novelist, children's writer, playwright
Felícia Fuster (1921–2012), Catalan-language poet, translator

G
Patrícia Gabancho (1952–2017), Argentine-born Spanish journalist who wrote in Catalan
Belén Gache (born 1960), Argentine-born novelist, electronic poet, living in Madrid
Ana Galán (born 1964), children's writer, humorous writer, writing in Spanish and English
Rosa Galcerán (1917–2015), cartoonist and poet
Adela Galiana (1825–?), Spanish writer, playwright, poet and columnist
Beatriz Galindo (c.1465–1534), Latinist and educator
María Rosa Gálvez de Cabrera (1768–1806), poet and playwright
Berta García Faet (born 1988), poet and translator
María Esther García López (born 1948), poet and writer; president, Asturias Writers Association
Adelaida García Morales (1945–2014), novelist, actress
Yolanda García Serrano (born 1958), scriptwriter and playwright
Olvido García Valdés (born 1950), poet, biographer, translator
Fanny Garrido (1846–1917), Galician writer and translator
Alicia Giménez Bartlett (born 1951), detective novelist
Teresa Giménez Barbat (born 1955), anthropologist, writer and politician
Lupe Gómez (born 1972), Galician-language poet, literary critic, columnist
Mar Gómez Glez (born 1977), playwright and novelist
Paloma Gómez Borrero (1934–2017), journalist and writer
Eloísa Gómez-Lucena, contemporary novelist, non-fiction writer, historian
Consuelo González Ramos (1877–?), journalist and feminist
Enriqueta González Rubín (1832–1877), novelist and writer in Asturian
Belén Gopegui (born 1963), novelist, journalist
Dolores Gortázar Serantes (1872–1936), novelist, journalist and activist
María Goyri de Menéndez Pidal (1873–1955), literary critic, poet, feminist
Almudena Grandes (1960–2021), erotic novelist, short story writer
María José Guerra Palmero (born 1962), philosopher, non-fiction writer, and feminist theorist
Olga Guirao (born 1956), novelist
Goya Gutiérrez (born 1954), poet

H
Úrsula Heinze (born 1941), poet, novelist, essayist, short story writer and children's writer
Francisca Herrera Garrido (1869–1950), Galician-language novelist, poet
María Gertrudis Hore (1742–1801), poet
Begoña Huertas (1965–2022), writer, philologist and journalist

I
Carmen de Icaza (1899–1979), novelist
María Antonia Iglesias (1945–2014), journalist, non-fiction writer
Lola Iturbe (1902–1990), trade unionist and journalist
Mari Carmen Izquierdo (1950–2019), pioneering sports journalist

J
Maria de la Pau Janer (born 1966), Catalan-language novelist
Clara Janés (born 1940), acclaimed poet, novelist, essayist, translator
Palmira Jaquetti i Isant (1895–1963), folklorist, poet, and writer
Isabel de Josa (c.1508–1575), Catalan writer
Inés Joyes y Blake (1731–1808), translator and feminist essayist
Juana Teresa Juega López (1885–1979), Galician-language poet
Conxita Julià (1920–2019), Catalan-language poet
Cristina Jurado (born 1972), science fiction and fantasy writer and editor

K
Carmen Karr (1865–1943), feminist and journalist
Alicia Kopf (born 1982), novelist and academic

L
Ángela Labordeta (born 1967), novelist, journalist
María Elvira Lacaci(1916–1997), Galician poet
Carmen Laforet (1921–2004), existentialist novelist, short story writer
Regina de Lamo (1870–1947), pianist, writer, journalist and activist
Margarita Landi (1918–2004), journalist and television presenter
Paula Lapido (born 1945), short story writer
María Teresa León (1903–1988), novelist, short story writer, playwright, children's writer, columnist
Rosa Leveroni (1910–1985), Catalan-language poet 
Gemma Lienas (born 1951), writer, feminist activist, politician
Lucía Lijtmaer (born 1977), journalist, writer
Elvira Lindo (born 1962), journalist, novelist, playwright
Eulàlia Lledó (born 1952), philologist and non-fiction writer
Ángeles López de Ayala (1858–1926), playwright, journalist and activist
Leonor López de Córdoba (1362–1430), Spain's earliest autobiographer
Marian Lopez Fernandez-Cao (born 1964), academic, curator and art writer
Mariló López Garrido (born 1963)
Rosaura Lopez (1932–2005), maid who wrote about John Lennon
Irene Lozano (born 1971), writer, journalist and politician

M
Ángeles Maestro (born 1952), Spanish politician
Chantal Maillard (born 1951), poet, essayist, non-fiction works on philosophy
Helena Maleno (born 1970), journalist, writer and activist
Maria Mercè Marçal (1952–1998), Catalan-language poet, translator
Carolina Marcial Dorado (1889–1941), educator and writer based in USA
Inés Marful (born 1965), scholar
María Mariño (1907–1967), Galician writer
Inka Martí (born 1964), journalist, editor, writer and photographer
Carmen Martín Gaite (1925–2000), novelist, short story writer, essayist, playwright, children's writer
Inés Martín Rodrigo (born 1983), writer and cultural journalist, winner of Premio Nadal
Ana María Martínez Sagi (1907–2000), poet, journalist, feminist and trade unionist
Laia Martínez i López (born 1984), poet and translator
Susana Martinez-Conde (born 1969), Spanish-American researcher, non-fiction writer
Raquel Martínez-Gómez (born 1973), novelist
Toti Martínez de Lezea (born 1949), novelist, translator, writing in Spanish and Basque
Maria del Pilar Maspons i Labrós (1841–1907), poet and novelist
María Josefa Massanés (1811–1887), poet
Pilar Mateos (born 1942), children's writer
Ana María Matute (1925–2014), highly acclaimed novelist, short story writer 
Megan Maxwell (born 1965), romantic chick lit novelist
Patricia Mayayo (born 1967), non-fiction writer
Antonia Maymón (1881–1959), novelist and non-fiction writer
Margarita de Mayo Izarra (1889–1969), journalist and teacher
Miren Agur Meabe (born 1962), Basque writer and translator
Elena Medel (born 1985), poet, literary critic
Susana Medina (born 1966), poetry and prose in Spanish and English
Concha Méndez (1898–1986), poet, playwright, member of Generation of '27
Ana Merino (born 1971), poet, novelist, educator, living in the United States
Sara Mesa (born 1976), poet and novelist
Ana María Moix (1947–2014), poet, novelist, short story writer, translator
Selena Millares (born 1963), poet, essayist and academic
Montserrat Minobis i Puntonet (1942–2019), journalist and academic
Laura Mintegi (born 1965), novelist, politician and academic
Pilar Molina Llorente (born 1943), children's writer
Empar Moliner (born 1966), writer and journalist
Dolors Monserdà (1845–1919), poet, novelist and playwright
Rosa Montero (born 1951), journalist, acclaimed novelist
Carmen Montoriol Puig (1893–1966), Catalan poet, playwright, translator
Federica Montseny (1905–1994), novelist, essayist, politician
María Luz Morales (1889–1980), pioneering cultural journalist and writer
María Victoria Moreno (1939–2005), children's writer, poet and essayist, writing in both Spanish and Galician
Teresa Moure (born 1969), Galician-language essayist, novelist, children's writer
Elisabeth Mulder (1904–1987), poet, novelist, short story writer
Estefanía Muñiz (born 1974), poet and scriptwriter
Isabel Muñoz-Caravaca (1838–1915), journalist writer and labour activist 
Anna Murià (1904–2002), short story writer, novelist, children's writer, essayist

N
Elvira Navarro (born 1978), novelist and short story writer
Julia Navarro (born 1953), best-selling novelist, journalist, novels widely translated but not into English
Margarita Nelken (1894–1968), feminist and writer
Marysa Navarro (born 1934), academic and essayist
Carmen Nonell (born 1920), novelist
Olga Novo (born 1975), Galician-language poet, essayist

O
Carlota O'Neill (1905–2000), novelist, non-fiction writer and journalist
Mercedes Odina (born 1959), journalist, non-fiction writer
Maria Antònia Oliver Cabrer (1946–2022), Catalan-language novelist, short story writer, translator
Lourdes Oñederra (born 1957), Basque-language novelist, short story writer, academic works on linguistics
Rocío Orsi (1976-2014), essayist, translator
Lourdes Ortiz (born 1943), novelist, poet, essayist, translator
Marisol Ortiz de Zárate (born 1960), children's writer
Constanza Ossorio (1595–1637), poet and writer
Isabel Oyarzábal Smith (1878–1974), feminist writer, journalist, diplomat

P
Pilar Pallarés (born 1957), Galician poet
Teresa Pàmies (1919–2012), non-fiction Catalan writer
Emilia Pardo Bazán, novelist, journalist, essayist, critic, associated with the naturalistic movement
Ana Pardo de Vera (born 1974), journalist and newspaper editor
Victòria Peña i Nicolau,(1827–1898), Mallorcan poet
Pilar Pedraza (born 1951), novelist and essayist
Paloma Pedrero (born 1957), actress and playwright
María Dolores Pérez Enciso (1908–1949), journalist, essayist
Mónica Pérez de las Heras (born 1965), journalist, writer and academic
Isabel Pérez Montalbán (born 1964), poet
Narcisa Pérez Reoyo (1849–1876), writer
Gloria Pérez-Salmerón (born 1958), national librarian and writer
Núria Perpinyà (born 1961), Catalan-language novelist, essayist
Marta Pessarrodona (born 1941), poet, literary critic, essayist, biographer
Julia Piera (born 1970), poet
Maria del Pilar Maspons i Labrós (1841–1907), poet, novelist, folklorist 
Aurora Picornell, political activist and martyr
Berta Piñán (born 1963), writer, poet, politician
Florencia del Pinar (15th century), early female poet
Valentina Pinelo (17th century), religious writer
Irene Polo (1909–1942), journalist and translator
Núria Pompeia (1931–2016), cartoonist, journalist and writer in both Spanish and Catalan
Marta Portal (1930–2016), novelist, short story writer and essayist
Luz Pozo Garza (1922–2020), poet
Nativel Preciado (born 1948), journalist and non-fiction writer
Isabel Prieto de Landázuri (1833–1876), poet and dramatist

Q
Ana Rosa Quintana (born 1956), journalist and television presenter
Rebeca Quintáns (born 1964), journalist and research writer
Elena Quiroga (1921–1995), novelist

R
Llucia Ramis (born 1977), journalist and novelist
Dolores Redondo (born 1969), novelist
Rosa Regàs (born 1933), novelist, columnist
Charlotte Remfry (1869–1957), writer and translator
Eugenia Rico (born 1972), novelist, poet, journalist
Lolo Rico (1935–2019), children's writer and television producer
Carme Riera (born 1948), Catalan-language novelist, essayist, short story writer, critic, also writes in Spanish
Pilar del Río (born 1950), journalist, writer and translator
Blanca de los Ríos (1862–1956), novelist, essayist and painter
Marta Rivera de la Cruz (born 1970), novelist
Margarita Rivière (1944–2015), journalist and non-fiction writer
Marta Robles (born 1963), writer of fiction and non-fiction, television scriptwriter and presenter
Maria Mercè Roca (born 1958), Catalan short story writer, novelist, politician
Cristina Rodríguez (born 1972), French-language journalist, novelist
Fátima Rodríguez (born 1961), writer, translator, professor
Mercè Rodoreda (October 10, 1908 – April 13, 1983), Catalan novelist
Cristina Rodríguez (born 1972), journalist, historian and novelist who writes in French
Fanny Rubio (born 1949), novelist and literary critic

S
Oliva Sabuco (1562–c.1622), medical and psychological works
Faustina Sáez de Melgar (1834–1895), novelist, poet and essayist
Juana Salabert (born 1962), writer, journalist, literary critic and translator
Ada Salas (born 1965), poet and educator
María Salas Larrazábal (1922–2008), writer, journalist
Mercedes Salisachs (1916–2014), novelist, short story writer
Marcela de San Félix (1605–1687), poet, religious writer
Isabel San Sebastián (born 1959), journalist, writer and broadcaster
Clara Sánchez (born 1955), novelist
Cristina Sánchez-Andrade (born 1968), novelist and translator
Cèlia Sànchez-Mústich (born 1954), Catalan-language poet, short story writer
Lucía Sánchez Saornil (1895–1970), poet and feminist
Encarna Sant-Celoni i Verger (born 1959), narrative writer, poet and translator
Elena Santiago (1941–2021), novelist and short story writer
Care Santos (born 1970), journalist and novelist writing in Spanish and Catalan
Paloma Sánchez-Garnica (born 1962), novelist
Lucía Sánchez Saornil (1895–1970), poet, feminist writer
Encarna Sant-Celoni i Verger (born 1959), Valencian poet, narrative writer
Elena Santiago (1941–2021), novelist, short story, and children's writer
Ana Santos Aramburo (born 1957), national librarian and writer
Care Santos (born 1970), novelist, children's writer, writes in Catalan and Spanish
Belén de Sárraga (1874–1951), journalist
Marta Sanz (born 1967), novelist and poet
Elvira Sastre (born 1992), poet and translator
Marta Segarra (born 1963), essayist
Berta Serra Manzanares (born 1958), poet and novelist
Luisa Sigea de Velasco (1522–1560), poet, wrote mainly in Latin
Isabel-Clara Simó (1943–2020), Catalan-language journalist and writer
Teresa Solana (born 1962), crime novelist
Carme Solé Vendrell (born 1944), illustrator and children's writer
Sílvia Soler i Guasch (born 1961), Catalan-language writer and journalist
Maria Assumpció Soler i Font (1913–2004), Catalan writer and journalist
Dolores Soler-Espiauba (born 1935), novelist
Anna Soler-Pont (born 1968), writer
Cristina Spínola (born 1976), journalist, athlete, YouTuber

T
Sofía Tartilán (1829–1888), novelist, essayist, journalist, editor
Corín Tellado (1927–2009), novelist
Ana Tena (born 1966), Aragonese short story writer
Teresa de Cartagena (15th century), early feminist, autobiographer
Teresa of Ávila (1515–1582), mystical writer
Mònica Terribas i Sala (born 1968), Catalan journalist, educator, broadcasting executive
Josefina de la Torre (1907–2002), poet, novelist, opera singer, actress
Carme Torras (born 1956), computer scientist, technical writer and novelist
Maruja Torres (born 1943), journalist
Xohana Torres (1929–2017), poet, playwright and novelist
Laura Tremosa (born 1937), engineer, feminist, non-fiction writer
Esther Tusquets (1936–2012), publisher, novelist, essayist

U
Rosana Ubanell (born 1958), journalist, detective story novelist
Pilar Urbano (born 1940), journalist and non-fiction writer
Arantxa Urretabizkaia (born 1947), Basque-language novelist, screenwriter, poet
Carmina Useros (1928–2017), writer, ceramist, painter, and cultural manager

V
Amelia Valcarcel (born 1950), philosopher, feminist, non-fiction writer
Pilar de Valderrama (1889–1879), poet and playwright
Curri Valenzuela (born 1945), journalist and non-fiction writer
Julieta Valero (born 1971), poet
Maria Vallejo-Nágera (born 1964), novelist
Ángela Vallvey (born 1964), children's writer, novelist
Brigitte Vasallo (born 1973), writer and social activist
Ana María Vázquez Hoys (born 1945), non-fiction writer, historic novelist, historian
María Teresa de Vega, novelist and poet
Maria Verger (1892–1983), archivist, librarian and poet in Catalan and Spanish
Isabel Vericat (born 1970), author and translator
Antònia Vicens (born 1941), short story writer, novelist, children's writer, writes in Catalan
Beatriz Villacañas (born 1964), poet, essayist, critic

W
Sultana Wahnón (born 1960), essayist, literary critic and academic

X
Olga Xirinacs Díaz (born 1936), poet, playwright, essayist and children's writer
Xosefa Xovellanos (1745–1807), Asturian poet

Z
María Zambrano (1904–1991), essayist, philosopher, belonged to the Generation of '36
María de Zayas (1590–1661), pioneer of literary feminism
Pilar de Zubiaurre (1884–1970), essayist, letter writer

See also
List of women writers
List of Spanish-language authors

References

-
Spanish women writers, List of
Writers,
Writers